Yan Paing born 27 November 1983 in Yangon) is a Burmese footballer who plays for the Myanmar national football team. He also plays with Yadanarbon in Myanmar National League. Yan Paing is a key striker for the Myanmar National Team and Yadanarbon FC. He became a popular player playing with former club Finance & Revenue FC.

Career

International career
Yan Paing entered the international scene after scoring the second goal against Singapore in a group match of the 2001 South-East Asian Games football tournament. His goal sent Myanmar to the semi-finals. After losing to Malaysia 0–1 in the semis, Myanmar defeated Indonesia 1-0 for the bronze medal and Yan Paing was the scorer of the lone goal of the game.

In 2002, Yan Paing was featured in Myanmar National Team for the Tiger Cup tournament. In Myanmar's first group match against Indonesia, he was a constant threat for the Indonesian defence and had a shot at goal hit the bar. The match ended a 0–0 draw but Yan Paing cemented his place in the National Team. He was injured for the rest of the group games in the tournament.

Injuries and red cards prevented Yan Paing from making his mark in Tiger Cup 2004.

Yan Paing had played for Myanmar at the 2008 AFC Challenge Cup.

Yan Paing was joint top goalscorer in 2007 Merdeka Cup.

In August 2017, he retired from Myanmar National Team.

Club career
He was top goalscorer in the inaugural Myanmar National League Cup 2009 with 7 goals in 8 games, including a goal scored in the penalty shoot-out for the Final between Yadanarbon FC and Yangon United. Yan Paing was also included in SoccerMyanmar.com's Best 11 players list for MNL Cup 2009.

Yan Paing was linked to a move to Thai Premier League Club Muangthong United in mid-July 2009 but he remained with Yadanabon.

In January 2010, Yadanarbon became champions of the first ever Myanmar National League season, and Yan Paing was crowned Best Player for his role in helping Yadanarbon to both the MNL Cup and MNL League titles.

Style of Play
He was a highly goal scoring striker for his clubs before 2011.
Now he is the super-sub striker for the current team'Yadanarbon'.

References

External links

1983 births
Living people
Sportspeople from Yangon
Burmese footballers
Myanmar international footballers
Burmese expatriate footballers
Yadanarbon F.C. players
Association football forwards
Southeast Asian Games bronze medalists for Myanmar
Southeast Asian Games medalists in football
Competitors at the 2001 Southeast Asian Games